The Ming dynasty was an imperial dynasty of China that existed from 1368 to 1644.

Ming may also refer to:

People
 Ming (surname) (明), a Chinese surname
 Ming (given name), a Chinese given name
 MING (DJ), American DJ
 William Robert Ming, American civil rights lawyer
 Luke 'Ming' Flanagan, an Irish politician,  who takes his name from his resemblance to the fictional Ming the Merciless
 Norman Walsh, nickname for the Rhodesian and Zimbabwean air marshal

Chinese Emperors
 Emperor Ming of Han (28–75) 
 Emperor Ming of Wei (205–239), see Cao Rui
 Emperor Ming of Zhao (274–333), see Shi Le
 Emperor Ming of Jin (299–325)
 Emperor Ming of Liu Song (439–472)
 Emperor Ming of Southern Qi (452–498)
 Emperor Ming of Northern Zhou (534–560)

Fictional
 Ming Lee, mother of Meilin Lee in Turning Red
 Ming the Merciless, a comic book character and archenemy of Flash Gordon

Other uses
 Southern Ming, a series of loyalist regimes established following the collapse of the Ming dynasty
 Ming River in Hebei, China
 Ming Prefecture (disambiguation) (Mingzhou), historical prefectures of imperial China
 Ming (typefaces), a common category of typefaces for printing Chinese characters
 Ming class submarine, a class of diesel-electric submarines built by China
 Motorola MING, a smartphone released by Motorola
 Ming library, a C library with dynamic language bindings for creating Adobe Flash (.swf) files
 Ming-Ming Duckling, a character from Wonder Pets
 Ming of Harlem, a tiger who lived in a New York apartment
 Ming (clam), an individual clam, claimed to be the oldest living animal ever discovered
 Immingham, a town in North East Lincolnshire often known as "Ming" or "Ming-Ming"
 Ming (album)

See also
 Menzies, a Scottish name often shortened to "Ming"